Carl Wilkinson (born 9 May 1984) is an English professional darts player playing in Professional Darts Corporation events.

He attended UK Q-School in 2019, where he won a two-year Tour Card after finishing 2nd on the Order of Merit rankings.

He attributes much of his success to his mentor and hero Dave "The Thud" Calvert.

References

External links

Living people
English darts players
Professional Darts Corporation former tour card holders
1984 births